Carla Farmer is an American make-up artist. She was nominated for an Academy Award in the category Best Makeup and Hairstyling for the film Coming 2 America.

Selected filmography 
 Coming 2 America (2021; co-nominated with Mike Marino and Stacey Morris)

References

External links 

Living people
Year of birth missing (living people)
Place of birth missing (living people)
American make-up artists
21st-century African-American women